Zheng Kai (born 17 April 1986), also known as Ryan Zheng, is a Chinese actor and television personality. He graduated from Shanghai Theatre Academy Performance Institute in 2008. During university, he was roommates with famous actors: Du Jiang (杜江), Chen He (陈赫) and Zhang Dianlun (张殿伦). After graduating, he signed with Huayi Brothers Media Corporation. Zheng is best known for being a cast member in the variety show Keep Running. He is also known for starring in films So Young, My Lucky Star, Personal Tailor and Ex-Files. On 21 May 2020, he announced his marriage with his wife, Vivi Miao. The couple have two children: a daughter (born October 2020) and a son (born June 2022). Zheng ranked 86th on Forbes China Celebrity 100 in 2015, 67th list in 2017, and 68th in 2019.

Filmography

Film

Television series

Variety show

Discography

Singles

Awards and nominations

References

External links
 
 Zheng Kai on Sina Weibo

1986 births
Living people
Chinese male film actors
Chinese male television actors
Chinese television personalities
Male actors from Shanghai
Shanghai Theatre Academy alumni
21st-century Chinese male actors